Bet, Queen of Jordan is a 1924 Dutch silent film directed by Adrienne Solser.

Cast
 Adrienne Solser - Bet Strik (as Adrieënne Solser)
 Jan Nooy - Hein Strik
 Beppie Nooy Sr. - Trui Bles / De Weduwe

External links 
 

Dutch silent feature films
1924 films
Dutch black-and-white films